Eaton Boat is the name of a house within the grounds of Eaton Hall, Cheshire, England.  It was originally called Gas Works Cottages.  The house is recorded in the National Heritage List for England as a designated Grade II listed building.

History

Eaton Boat was built in about 1877 or about 1880 to a design by the Chester architect John Douglas for the 1st Duke of Westminster.

Architecture

The house is constructed in sandstone and has half-timbered gables.  The roof is patterned with red and blue tiles.  There are five chimneys, one of which is plain and the others are shaped.  To the west is a single-storey outbuilding, constructed in common brick with a tiled roof.

See also

Listed buildings in Eaton, Cheshire West and Chester
List of houses and associated buildings by John Douglas

References

Houses completed in 1880
John Douglas buildings
Grade II listed buildings in Cheshire
Houses in Cheshire